Valley is a city in Chambers County, Alabama, United States. Valley was incorporated in 1980 combining the four textile mill villages of Fairfax, Langdale, River View, and Shawmut. As of the 2010 census it had a population of 9,524. The city lies on the western bank of the Chattahoochee River, the state border between Alabama and Georgia. Valley is a pilot city for the Alabama Communities of Excellence program, a non-profit that partners with governments, businesses, and universities to prepare participating communities for a more vibrant future. It is included in the LaGrange, Georgia Micropolitan Statistical Area, which is included in the Greater Atlanta Combined Statistical Area.

Geography
Valley is located in southeastern Chambers County at 32°48'40.993" North, 85°10'40.577" West (32.811387, -85.177938).

The city is located on the Alabama-Georgia state line. Interstate 85 runs through its northern city limits, with access from exits 77 and 79. Via I-85, Atlanta is 84 mi (135 km) northeast and Montgomery is 79 mi (127 km) southwest. U.S. Route 29 also runs through the city, connecting the city to Lanett and West Point, Georgia to the north and leading southwest 19 mi (31 km) to Opelika.

Valley has a larger Micropolitan Statistical Area known as the "Greater Valley Area" consisting of the three largest cities of Chambers County: Valley, Lanett, and LaFayette. It also includes the city of West Point, Georgia.

Climate
The climate in this area is characterized by hot, humid summers and generally mild to cool winters.  According to the Köppen Climate Classification system, Valley has a humid subtropical climate, abbreviated "Cfa" on climate maps.

Demographics

2020 census

As of the 2020 United States census, there were 10,529 people, 3,654 households, and 2,228 families residing in the city.

2010 census
As of the census of 2010, there were 9,524 people, 3,878 households, and 2,561 families residing in the city. The racial makeup of the city was 64.0% White, 33.0% Black or African American, 0.1% Native American, 1.2% Asian, 0.6% from other races, and 1.1% from two or more races. 1.7% of the population were Hispanic or Latino of any race.

There were 3,878 households, out of which 26.7% had children under the age of 18 living with them, 42.2% were married couples living together, 18.6% had a female householder with no husband present, and 34.0% were non-families. 30.5% of all households were made up of individuals, and 13.3% had someone living alone who was 65 years of age or older. The average household size was 2.43 and the average family size was 3.02.

In the city, the population was spread out, with 23.9% under the age of 18, 7.9% from 18 to 24, 26.2% from 25 to 44, 25.3% from 45 to 64, and 16.7% who were 65 years of age or older. The median age was 39.3 years. For every 100 females, there were 88.1 males. For every 100 females age 18 and over, there were 89.7 males.

The median income for a household in the city was $31,501, and the median income for a family was $40,013. Males had a median income of $36,345 versus $29,905 for females. The per capita income for the city was $15,928. About 18.2% of families and 20.7% of the population were below the poverty line, including 28.4% of those under age 18 and 12.9% of those age 65 or over.

Media
Valley is served by the Columbus, Georgia Television Designated Market Area (DMA).

Notable people
Jennifer Chandler, won a gold medal in diving at the 1976 Summer Olympics in Montreal
Josh Evans, former NFL player
Lemanski Hall, former NFL player
John Copeland, former NFL player
Bill McGhee, former player for the Philadelphia Athletics
Marcus Pollard, former NFL player
Mike Potts, former pitcher for the Milwaukee Brewers
K. Lee Scott, Christian composer
Jylan Ware, NFL player
Drew Ferguson (born), member of the United States House of Representatives from Georgia's 3rd congressional district
Matt Foster, pitcher for the Chicago White Sox

Photo gallery

References

External links
City of Valley official website

Cities in Alabama
Cities in Chambers County, Alabama
Populated places established in 1980
Micropolitan areas of Alabama
Alabama populated places on the Chattahoochee River
1980 establishments in Alabama